Riley Hill (born Roy Lawrence Harris, March 20, 1914 – September 16, 1993) was an American actor who appeared in both film and television. Over the span of his career he appeared in 71 feature films and over a dozen television series.

Biography
Born Roy Lawrence Harris on March 20, 1914, in Fort Worth, Texas, his parents were Charlie Morris Harris and Mary Irene Bowers. He began acting under his real name with a small role in the 1937 film, The Firefly. By the beginning of the next decade he was getting significant roles in Hollywood westerns such as Law of the Range (1941), Men of the Timberland (1941), Rawhide Rangers (1941), Texas Trouble Shooters (1942), and Arizona Stage Coach (1942).

Arizona Stage Coach would be the last picture he appeared in before, in 1942, his film career was interrupted by World War II, when he was drafted into the U.S. Army. It would also be the last film he would use his real name in. After being released from military service he took up the stage name of Riley Hill, and had a significant role in 1944's Ghost Guns. During the remainder of the 1940s he had significant roles in numerous films, including Flame of the West (1945), Sheriff of Cimarron (1945), Gun Smoke (1945), Border Bandits (1946), Under Arizona Skies (1946), The Haunted Mine (1946), Trigger Fingers (1946), Flashing Guns (1947), Code of the Saddle (1947), Range Renegades (1948), and The Rangers Ride (1948). He finished the decade with featured roles in seven films in 1949, including Shadows of the West, Across the Rio Grande, Range Justice, Law of the West, and Lawless Code.

The 1950s saw Hill continue in major supporting roles, along with the occasional starring role in B westerns, as well as lesser roles. He had one of the starring roles in 1950's Law of the Panhandle, and significant roles that same year in Six Gun Mesa and Fence Riders. After 1951 his roles began to diminish, although he did have a significant supporting role in the 1952 western, Target, and 1953's White Lightning. 

With the advent of television, Hill began to transition to that medium.  He appeared in The Lone Ranger, Dick Tracy, The Gene Autry Show, and The Range Rider during the early 1950s. He had the significant role of the apostle John in the 1952 series, The Living Bible.  The remainder of the decade saw him continue to appear on television, mostly in westerns such as The Roy Rogers Show, The Cisco Kid, Adventures of Wild Bill Hickok, and The Adventures of Kit Carson.  His last significant part was in a recurring role in Mackenzie's Raiders during 1958–59.

At some point in the early 1960s Hill moved to Tucson, Arizona.  He only appeared in films which were shot in Arizona after this time.  He had a significant role in The Trial of Billy Jack in 1974, and smaller roles in 1976's The Last Hard Men and several other films in the 1960s and 1970s.  His last significant role, and second to last performance, was in When You Comin' Back, Red Ryder? (1979).

Filmography

(Per AFI database)

 The Firefly (1937) credited as Roy Harris - Lieutenant
 Oklahoma Frontier (1939) credited as Roy Harris - Trooper
 The Flame of New Orleans credited as Roy Harris (1941)
 Mob Town (1941) credited as Roy Harris - Boy
 San Antonio Rose (1941) credited as Roy Harris - Jimmy
 Men of the Timberland (1941) credited as Roy Harris - Withers
 Flying Cadets (1941) credited as Roy Harris - Barnes
 Nice Girl? (1941) credited as Roy Harris - Doug
 Law of the Range (1941) credited as Roy Harris - Wolverine Kid
 Rawhide Rangers (1941) credited as Roy Harris - Steve Calhoun
 Meet the Chump (1941) credited as Roy Harris - Clerk
 Bombay Clipper (1942) credited as Roy Harris - Steward
 North to the Klondike (1942) credited as Roy Harris - Ben Sloan
 Top Sergeant (1942) credited as Roy Harris - Roy
 Texas Trouble Shooters (1942) credited as Roy Harris - Bret Travis
 Arizona Stage Coach (1942) credited as Roy Harris - Ernie
 Ghost Guns (1944) - Ted Connors
 What Next, Corporal Hargrove? (1945) - Private
 Flame of the West (1945) - Jack Midland
 Sheriff of Cimarron (1945) - Ted Cartwright
 Gun Smoke (1945) - Joel Hinkley
 The Navajo Trail (1945) - Paul
 The Lost Trail (1945) - Ned Turner
 The Desert Horseman (1946) - Eddie
 Border Bandits (1946) - Steve Halliday
 Under Arizona Skies (1946) - Bill Simpson
 The Haunted Mine (1946) - Dan McLeod
 Trigger Fingers (1946) - Jimmy Peters
 Flashing Guns (1947) - Fred Shelby
 Code of the Saddle (1947) - Bill Stace
 Jiggs and Maggie in Court (1948) - Dennis Malone
 Frontier Agent (1948) - Joe Farr
 Range Renegades (1948) - Larry Jordan
 The Rangers Ride (1948) - Vic Sanders
 Shadows of the West (1949) - Carl Davis
 Across the Rio Grande (1949) - Steven Blaine
 Range Justice (1949) - Glenn Hadley
 Western Renegades (1949) - Joe Gordon
 Law of the West (1949) - Charley Lane
 Lawless Code (1949) - Curly Blake
 Bride for Sale (1949) credited as Roy Harris - Clerk 
 Gunslingers (1950) - Tim Cramer
 Radar Secret Service (1950) - Blacky
 Short Grass (1950) - Randee Fenton
 Silver Raiders (1950) - Bill
 Jiggs and Maggie Out West (1950) - Bob Carter
 Six Gun Mesa (1950) - Dave Emmett
 Law of the Panhandle (1950) - Tom Stocker
 Fence Riders (1950) - Hutch
 Valley of Fire (1951) - Colorado
 Canyon Raiders (1951) - Lou Banks
 Nevada Badmen (1951) - Jess
 Navy Bound (1951) - Officer
 The Vanishing Outpost (1951) - Walker
 I Was an American Spy (1951) - Thompson
 Outlaw Women (1952) - John Ringo
 The Raiders (1952) - Clarke Leftus
 Night Stage to Galveston (1952) - Police lieutenant
 Here Come the Marines (1952) - Captain Harlow
 The Lusty Men (1952) - Hoag
 Wagons West (1952) - Gaylord Cook
 Target (1952) - Foster
 Fort Vengeance (1953) - Montana deputy
 White Lightning (1953) - Horwin
 Buchanan Rides Alone (1958) - Juror
 The Threat (1960) - Police Sergeant
 Ma Barker's Killer Brood (1960) - Deputy
 The Trial of Billy Jack (1974) - Stuart Posner
 The Last Hard Men (1976) - Gus
 Wanda Nevada (1979) - Reporter #2
 When You Comin' Back, Red Ryder? (1979) - Junior Ferguson

References

External links
 
 Riley Hill's page on B-Westerns
 Riley Hill's page on Western Clippings

1914 births
1993 deaths
Male actors from Fort Worth, Texas
Male Western (genre) film actors